Codan or CODAN  may refer to:
 Codan, an Australian manufacturer and supplier of communications, metal detection, and electronic equipment
 Codan A/S, a Danish insurance company
 Codan, a Danish rubber hose producer (Codan Rubber Danmark ApS) with global manufacturing sites
 Codan, a Danish company that produces health care products in Portugal, Denmark, Germany, United States, Switzerland and Italy
 CODAN, acronym for "Carrier Operated Discriminator Anti-Noise", a squelch circuit in a radio receiver

Many of the Danish companies are named after Codanus sinus.